The Golden West Lodge Historic District includes the Golden West Lodge (now the Golden West Visitor Center) and six log cabins around it in Stehekin, Washington.  Built in 1926, the lodge used salvaged portions of the Field Hotel, demolished the same year when the level of Lake Chelan was raised. Located in Lake Chelan National Recreation Area, the lodge was rehabilitated to function as the National Park Service Stehekin District Headquarters and Visitor Center in 2002.

The district was added to the National Register of Historic Places in 1989.

See also
 Purple Point-Stehekin Ranger Station House, also listed on the National Register of Historic Places and located just south of the historic district.

References

Hotel buildings on the National Register of Historic Places in Washington (state)
Buildings and structures in Stehekin, Washington
Historic districts on the National Register of Historic Places in Washington (state)
National Register of Historic Places in Chelan County, Washington
Hotel buildings completed in 1926
1989 establishments in Washington (state)